Lake George is a lake in Hubbard County, in the U.S. state of Minnesota.

Lake George was named for the brother of Minnesota explorer Captain Willard Glazier.

See also
List of lakes in Minnesota

References

Lakes of Minnesota
Lakes of Hubbard County, Minnesota